The Final Round, released in Japan as , is a boxing arcade game released by Konami in 1988.

A player selects one of two different boxers, and they fight another boxer in a three-round bout. If the player wins, he moves on to the next opponent, climbing the KBA (Konami Boxing Association) rankings along the way. If he loses, he can insert another coin for another chance (rematch). Fights can be won by either knockout, technical knockout or the judges' decision.

Gameplay 
When a one-player game is started, one of two different boxers can be selected by pressing the one or two player button. The player then allocates 100 points between three different skills (Speed, Power, and Stamina). A high "Speed" level makes a boxer move and punch faster. A high "Power" level makes a boxer cause more damage when punching, and a high "Stamina" level makes a boxer endure more damage and recover more energy after being knocked down. When a two-player game is started, both boxers allocate their points and fight against each other. The winner stays, while the loser may get a rematch by inserting another coin. During a normal game, a second player can buy-in and challenge at any time (except during "training sessions").

The player uses the joystick to move around the ring, as well as three buttons: face punch, body punch, and block punch. During a bout, the block punch button protects the player's fighter from enemy attacks and switches the character's guard between face and body each time it's pressed. The two punch buttons may be used alternately to pull out combinations or a special, more powerful "Super Punch".

If the player is knocked down, they must shake the joystick and press the buttons repeatedly to refill a bar and get back to their feet. Failing to do so will result in a Knockout loss. If any fighter is knocked down three times in a round, a TKO (Technical Knockout) will occur. These are highlighted with a special animation of the defeated boxer crumbling to the canvas. If all three rounds are fought, the judges decide the winner by decision. Each opponent has his own, unique fighting style with strengths and weaknesses.

Every two bouts, players are given the choice of entering a "training session" to earn more skill points or skip these sessions entirely. The "Speed" session consists of punching green dummies appearing from eight different positions. The "Power" session consists of punching small volleyballs tossed from both left and right, high and low. The "Stamina" session consists of jumping a spinning rod of increasing speed.

When the player defeats the World Champion, a special winning animation will play with a congratulatory message. The credits roll, and the game ends. The total fight time and final score are displayed on screen. Depending on the player's total time at the end of the game, the winning animation and message change, effectively serving as multiple endings.

Characters 
 Jabbin' Jim (Player 1)  Modeled after Sylvester Stallone's role as Rocky Balboa from the Rocky franchise as well as Lance Bean from the Contra franchise. Known as Rocky Smith in the Japanese version.
 Gentleman Joe (Player 2)  Modeled after Bill Rizer who is also from the Contra franchise. Known as Joe Vulcan in the Japanese version.
 Knockout Nick (KBA Rank: #7)  A lookalike of Mr. T's role as Clubber Lang from the film Rocky III (1982), but slow and weak. Known as Mr. Mohican in the Japanese version.
 Red Falco (KBA Rank: #6)  Seasoned boxer from England, his name is a play on "Red Falcon" from the Contra game series.
 Mad Mongol (KBA Rank: #5)  Mongolian slugger skilled in fast flurries.
 Iron Drago (KBA Rank: #4)  A tough Soviet fighter, based on Dolph Lundgren's role as Ivan Drago from the film Rocky IV.
 Steel Fist Fritz (KBA Rank: #3)  Powerful boxer from Italy. Named Mark Rentz in the Japanese version.
 Bronx Bruiser (KBA Rank: #2)  Fast and unpredictable Brazilian fighter. Named Avege Hidev in the Japanese version.
 Harlem Hit Man (KBA Rank: #1)  Murderous hitter of unknown origins. Named Marvin Cobra in the Japanese version.
 Black Stallion (KBA Champion)  Based on Mike Tyson, he's durable, strong and very fast.

Regional differences 
The Japanese version of the game (known internally as Version H) is notably different from its overseas counterparts (Versions L and M) in several ways: The player's energy does not constantly drain by merely walking around the ring. The two main characters and some of the enemy boxers have been given alternate names. Most of the voice samples have been changed from English to Japanese, and the presence of a few Easter Eggs not included in the American release.

These include a flock of birds appearing in the ring at the start of a fight (damage based), an alternate head (Moai) for the referee (time based), a bonus hidden in the "Power" training session, and two different circuits (game modes) made accessible via joystick input at the beginning of a new game.

Soundtrack 
The game's Soundtrack was produced by Konami Kukeiha Club and published by King Records on July 21, 1989 as part of "Konami Game Music Collection Vol.0" along additional soundtracks from Flak Attack (MX 5000), The Main Event, Gang Busters, City Bomber, and Devastators.

Related releases
The Main Event, a wrestling arcade game released by Konami that same year, shares many sound samples with The Final Round, most notably the referee's screams and count.

In 1996, Konami produced Eikou no Fairway, a golf simulator for the PlayStation game console. The game was renamed The Final Round for its release in North America.

The game's ROMs have been dumped and are supported in MAME.

Reception
In Japan, Game Machine listed The Final Round on their February 1, 1989 issue as being the fifth most-successful table arcade unit of the month. A review in The Games Machine described The Final Round as "nothing out of the ordinary" and "despite its title, by no means the definitive boxing game" but still praised the game's graphics.

References 

Boxing video games
1988 video games
Konami games
Arcade video games
Arcade-only video games
Multiplayer and single-player video games
Konami arcade games
Video games developed in Japan